Neptis troundi, the constricted club-dot sailer, is a butterfly in the family Nymphalidae. It is found in Sierra Leone, Liberia, Ivory Coast, Ghana, Nigeria, Cameroon, Gabon, the Republic of the Congo and the western part of the Democratic Republic of the Congo. The habitat consists of forests.

The larvae feed on Paullinia pinnata, Grewia carpinifolia, Millettia (including Millettia zechiana) and Allophylus species.

References

Butterflies described in 1978
troundi